Kholm-Zhirkovsky District is an administrative and municipal district (raion), one of the twenty-five in Smolensk Oblast, Russia. It is located in the north of the oblast. Its administrative center is the urban locality (a settlement) of Kholm-Zhirkovsky. Population: 10,717 (2010 Census);  The population of the administrative center accounts for 32.6% of the district's total population.

References

Notes

Sources

Districts of Smolensk Oblast